Marasmius elegans, commonly known as the velvet parachute, is a species of fungus in the family Marasmiaceae. It has a reddish-brown cap, and a whitish stipe with white hairs at the base. It can be found in eucalypt forests in Australia.

Taxonomy
The species was originally described as Collybia elegans by the Australian mycologist John Burton Cleland in 1933. Cheryl Grgurinovic transferred it to Marasmius in a 1997 publication.

See also
List of Marasmius species

References

elegans
Fungi of Australia
Fungi described in 1933
Taxa named by John Burton Cleland